Orlovka is a rural locality (a village) in Mikhaylovsky Selsoviet, Bakalinsky District, Bashkortostan, Russia. The population was 82 as of 2010. There are 2 streets.

Geography 
Orlovka is located 26 km south of Bakaly (the district's administrative centre) by road. Budennovets is the nearest rural locality.

References 

Rural localities in Bakalinsky District